Peter Chung Soon-taick,  (born 5 August 1961) is a South Korean prelate of the Catholic Church. Since December 2021, he has been the Metropolitan Archbishop of Seoul and Apostolic Administrator of Pyongyang.

Biography

Early life 
Chung was born on 5 August 1961 in Daegu, South Korea. After graduating from the Department of Industrial Chemistry at Seoul National University's College of Engineering in 1984, he transferred to the Songsin Theological Campus in the Catholic University of Korea, after which he entered the novitiate of the Order of Discalced Carmelites of Korea in May 1986. On 25 January 1992, he took his perpetual vows.

Priest 
Chung was ordained a Carmelite priest on 16 July 1992. He then earned a master's degree in Sacred Scripture at the Pontifical Biblical Institute. From 2005 to 2008, he served as Provincial Definitor of the Order of Discalced Carmelites of Korea and Vice-master of Incheon monastery and from 2008 to 2009, he served as the first Definitor of the Order of Discalced Carmelites of Korea and served as the Definitor General of the Order of Discalced Carmelites in Rome for the Far East and Oceania  from 2009 to 2013.

Bishop 
On 30 December 2013, Pope Francis appointed him an Auxiliary Bishop of Seoul and titular bishop of Tamazuca. He was consecrated with Timothy Yu Gyoung-chon on 5 February 2014 in the Changcheon-dong Stadium, Seoul, by Andrew Yeom Soo-jung, Archbishop of Seoul, assisted by Basil Cho Kyu-man, Vicar General of Seoul, and Linus Lee Seong-hyo, Auxiliary Bishop of Suwon. He chose as his episcopal motto: Deus Pater, Mater Ecclesia, meaning "God the Father, Mother Church" (Korean: 하느님 아버지, 어머니 교회).

Archbishop of Seoul 
On 28 October 2021, Pope Francis appointed him Metropolitan Archbishop of Seoul to succeed Cardinal Andrew Yeom Soo-jung. Chung was formally installed at the Myeongdong Cathedral of Our Lady of the Immaculate Conception on December 8, 2021.

References

External links
 Official website

21st-century Roman Catholic archbishops in South Korea
Living people
1961 births
People from Daegu
Discalced Carmelites
Roman Catholic bishops of Seoul
Discalced Carmelite bishops
Seoul National University alumni
Catholic University of Korea alumni
Pontifical Biblical Institute alumni
South Korean Roman Catholic archbishops